SA Police may refer to:

South African Police, former police force in South Africa from the early 20th century until the end of Apartheid.
South African Police Service, the current national police force of South Africa.
South Australia Police, the police force of the state of South Australia.